Abby Howe Turner (1875 – 1957) was a noted professor of physiology and zoology who founded the department of physiology at Mount Holyoke College.  She specialized in colloid osmotic pressure and circulatory reactions to gravity.

Life
Turner was born in Nashua, New Hampshire. She was the daughter of Emeline Mehitabel Cogswell and George Turner. She received her B.A. from Mount Holyoke in 1896. She then studied at the University of Pennsylvania, the University of Chicago, and the Harvard Medical School. She received her Ph.D. from Radcliffe College in 1926. She did research on students whilst she both taught and worked in a lab at Mount Holyoke from 1896 until her retirement in 1940. She specialized in colloid osmotic pressure and circulatory reactions to gravity. In one of her studies, Turner worked with student majoring in physiology and physical education to study the effects of posture on blood flow on the female body.

She was an intimate friend of the psychiatrist and author Esther Loring Richards, and they engaged in a long exchange of written correspondence which is today physically and digitally archived by Mount Holyoke College. 

Abby Howe Turner died in 1957.

References

1875 births
1957 deaths
American zoologists
American physiologists
Women physiologists
Women zoologists
University of Pennsylvania alumni
University of Chicago alumni
Harvard Medical School alumni
Mount Holyoke College alumni
Mount Holyoke College faculty
Radcliffe College alumni